The Catholic Church, sometimes called the Roman Catholic Church, is the largest Christian church body.

Catholic Church may also refer to:

 One of the 24 particular churches sui iuris that form the Catholic Church:
 The Latin Church, also known as the Roman Catholic Church or, historically, as the Western Church
 The Eastern Catholic Churches, 23 Eastern churches in full communion with the Catholic Church
 Independent Catholicism, churches that broke away from the Catholic Church
 Churches within Old Catholicism
 The Philippine Independent Church
 Other churches expressing apostolic origins and traditions of catholicity, such as:
 The Eastern Orthodox Church
 The Oriental Orthodox Churches
 The Assyrian Church of the East
 The Ancient Church of the East
 Churches within Anglicanism
 Certain denominations in Protestantism
 Churches within Lutheranism
 State church of the Roman Empire

See also
 Four Marks of the Church i.e. "one, holy, catholic and apostolic church"
 Catholicism (disambiguation)
 Catholic (disambiguation)
 Roman Catholic Church (disambiguation)
 Orthodox Church (disambiguation)
 National Catholic Church (disambiguation)
 Traditionalist Catholicism
 Illidius